Gresham High School may refer to:

Gresham High School (Oregon), Gresham, Oregon
Gresham High School (Wisconsin), Gresham, Wisconsin